The 2018–19 Nevada Wolf Pack women's basketball team will represent the University of Nevada, Reno during the 2018–19 NCAA Division I women's basketball season. The Wolf Pack, led by second year head coach Amanda Levens, play their home games at the Lawlor Events Center and were members of the Mountain West Conference. They finished the season 12–19, 7–11 in Mountain West play to finish in a tie for seventh place. They advanced to the quarterfinals of the Mountain West women's tournament where they lost to Boise State.

Roster

Schedule

|-
!colspan=9 style=| Non-conference regular season

|-
!colspan=9 style=| Mountain West regular season

|-
!colspan=9 style=| Mountain West Women's Tournament

See also
 2018–19 Nevada Wolf Pack men's basketball team

References

Nevada
Nevada Wolf Pack women's basketball seasons
Nevada Wolf Pack
Nevada Wolf Pack